Developer! Developer! Developer!, more commonly known as DDD, is a series of community conferences aimed at software developers.

History 
DDD conferences started in 2005, as a community conference organised by software developers for software developers. The first was held at Microsoft's TVP campus in Reading, United Kingdom. There have been 10 DDD conference held in this location, as well as a number of regional conferences held in Belfast, Brisbane, Bristol, Wales, Cambridge, Dublin, Dundee, Edinburgh, Galway, Glasgow, Leeds, Sunderland, Taunton, Bradford, Perth, Sydney, Melbourne, Brisbane and Adelaide.

The main DDD in Reading has frequently sold out on the day the tickets become available. The record is 350 tickets selling out in 13 minutes.

Key Values 
DDD was set up with a number of key elements in mind.

 It is free
 It is on a Saturday
 An open submissions process
 A democratically chosen agenda

References

External links 
 Main DDD Website
 DDD North Website
 DDD SouthWest Website
 DDD East Anglia Website
 DDD Scotland Website
 DDD Brisbane Website
 DDD Melbourne Website
 DDD Perth Website
 DDD Sydney Website
 DDD Wales
 DDD East Midlands (first event scheduled for 2019)
 DDD Brisbane Website
 DDD Adelaide Website

Software developer communities
Computer conferences
Microsoft conferences